Edge is a former civil parish, now in the parishes of No Man's Heath and District and Malpas, in Cheshire, England, The parish included Edge Hall and Edge Green. The population at the 2011 census was 247. The civil parish was abolished in 2015 to form No Man's Heath and District, part of it also went to Malpas.

See also

Listed buildings in Edge, Cheshire

References

Former civil parishes in Cheshire
Cheshire West and Chester
Malpas, Cheshire